José Luis Pineda Aragón (born 19 March 1975) is a retired professional Honduran footballer.

Club career
Nicknamed el Flaco (the Skinny One), Pineda played the majority of his career for Olimpia, winning a record 9 championship finals. In summer 2007 he joined Atlético Olanchano, then played for Victoria. He moved to second division Atlético Pinares for the 2012 Clausura.

Statistics

International career
Pineda made his debut for Honduras in a January 1996 CONCACAF Gold Cup match against Canada and has earned a total of 52 caps
, scoring 4 goals. He has represented his country in 21 FIFA World Cup qualification matches and played at the 1996 and 2000 CONCACAF Gold Cups.

His final international was an April 2004 friendly match against Panama.

International goals
Scores and results list. Honduras' goal tally first.

References

External links

1975 births
Living people
People from San Pedro Sula
Association football midfielders
Honduran footballers
Honduras international footballers
2000 CONCACAF Gold Cup players
C.D. Olimpia players
Club Atlético River Plate (Montevideo) players
Platense F.C. players
C.D. Victoria players
Liga Nacional de Fútbol Profesional de Honduras players
Honduran expatriate footballers
Expatriate footballers in Uruguay
Central American Games gold medalists for Honduras
Central American Games medalists in football
1996 CONCACAF Gold Cup players